The 2006 season of the Veikkausliiga the 17th season in the league's history, which began on April 19 and ended on October 29.
The league was originally supposed to have 14 teams, but AC Allianssi was refused a license, so the league was subsequently played with only 13 teams.

Table

Results

European results
Champions League:
 MyPa prevailed in the first round against The New Saints, but was knocked out by FC Copenhagen in the second round

UEFA Cup:
 HJK lost the first round to Drogheda United
 FC Haka lost the first round to FC Levadia Tallinn

Intertoto Cup:
 Tampere United won the first round against Carmarthen Town F.C., but was knocked out by Kalmar FF in the second round

Promotions and relegations
 The 2007 season is once again being contested by 14 teams. Only one team, KuPS, was relegated, while two teams from Division 1 were promoted, being FC Viikingit and AC Oulu.

Top goal scorers

External links
 Results from RSSSF

Veikkausliiga seasons
Fin
Fin
1